The Times News is a newspaper published daily except Sundays in Lehighton, Pennsylvania.

Its predecessor publications include the 1883 Mauch Chunk Daily Times of Mauch Chunk, Pennsylvania, and the 1951 Jim Thorpe Times News of Jim Thorpe, Pennsylvania.

References

External links
Official website

1883 establishments in Pennsylvania
Media in the Lehigh Valley
Newspapers published in Pennsylvania